Blyden Brown Jackson Jr. (June 2, 1936 – April 29, 2012) was an American civil rights activist, marine, author, and emergency medical technician. He is best known for his novels Operation Burning Candle and Totem. He was born in New Haven, Connecticut and died in Bayonne, New Jersey. During his life he served in the US Marines, where his experiences helped shaped the writing of Operation Burning Candle. He served as the chairman of the New Haven, Connecticut chapter of the Congress of Racial Equality (CORE) in the early-to-mid-1960s. He later founded and became the chairman of East River CORE, located on the east side of 125th street in Harlem, in New York City.

His last novel, For One Day of Freedom, is published posthumously by ANTIBOOKCLUB in December 2021.

Education
Jackson took fiction writing classes at New York University where he was taught by Sidney Offit.

Novels 
1973: Operation Burning Candle 
1975: Totem
2021: For One Day of Freedom

Media appearances
 1974-05-04. "Novelist Blyden Jackson, an SCE writing student, discusses his 1973 novel Operation Burning Candle with host Walter James Miller".

References

1937 births
2012 deaths
20th-century American novelists
20th-century American male writers
African-American novelists
American male novelists
Writers from New Haven, Connecticut
Writers from New York City
Activists from New York (state)
Novelists from New York (state)
Activists from Connecticut
Novelists from Connecticut
American civil rights activists
United States Marines
New York University alumni
20th-century African-American writers
21st-century African-American people
African-American male writers